The 1959 St. Louis Cardinals  season was the team's 78th season in St. Louis, Missouri and its 68th season in the National League. The Cardinals went 71–83 during the season and finished seventh in the National League, 16 games behind the NL pennant winner and World Champion Los Angeles Dodgers. They attracted 929,953 paying fans to Busch Stadium, fifth in the eight-team league.

Offseason 
 September 29, 1958: One day after the end of the 1958 National League regular season, Gene Freese was traded by the Cardinals to the Philadelphia Phillies for Solly Hemus. The 35-year-old Hemus, a ten-year MLB veteran, had begun his career as a Cardinal, playing in 684 games between 1949 and 1956. He had appeared in 85 games as a second baseman for the 1958 Phillies, but was immediately named the Redbirds' player-manager for 1959, succeeding interim skipper Stan Hack.
 October 8, 1958: Hobie Landrith, Billy Muffett and Benny Valenzuela were traded by the Cardinals to the San Francisco Giants for Marv Grissom and Ernie Broglio.
 October 15, 1958: Marshall Bridges was purchased by the Cardinals from the Sacramento Solons.
 December 1, 1958: Johnny O'Brien was drafted from the Cardinals by the Philadelphia Phillies in the 1958 rule 5 draft.
 December 3, 1958: Rubén Amaro was traded by the Cardinals to the Philadelphia Phillies for Chuck Essegian.
 December 4, 1958: Wally Moon and Phil Paine were traded by the Cardinals to the Los Angeles Dodgers for Gino Cimoli.
 March 25, 1959: Sam Jones and Don Choate were traded by the Cardinals to the San Francisco Giants for Ray Jablonski and Bill White.
 Prior to 1959 season (exact date unknown)
Lee Gregory was signed as an amateur free agent by the Cardinals.

Regular season

Season summary 
The Cardinals played the league's best baseball from early May into late July, during which time they went 40–30. In the end, pitching failed the Redbirds. Their 4.34 ERA was ranked worst in the National League.

There were some bright spots to the season. Larry Jackson and Lindy McDaniel, who found success and saved 15 games after an early-season move to the bullpen, each won a team-high 14 games. Also, third baseman Ken Boyer won a Gold Glove this year.

Right fielder Joe Cunningham led the National League in on-base percentage at .453 and batted .345 to finish second to Hank Aaron for the National League batting title.

Season standings

Record vs. opponents

Opening Day lineup

Notable transactions 
 June 8, 1959: Jim Brosnan was traded by the Cardinals to the Cincinnati Reds for Hal Jeffcoat.
 June 19, 1959: Solly Hemus was released by the Cardinals as an active player; he remained the team's manager.
 July 25, 1959: Jay Porter was selected off waivers by the Cardinals from the Washington Senators.
 August 4, 1959: Ray Katt was released by the Cardinals.
 August 20, 1959: Ray Jablonski was selected off waivers from the Cardinals by the Kansas City Athletics.
 September 6, 1959: Phil Gagliano was signed as an amateur free agent by the Cardinals.

Roster

Player stats

Batting

Starters by position 
Note: Pos = Position; G = Games played; AB = At bats; H = Hits; Avg. = Batting average; HR = Home runs; RBI = Runs batted in

Other batters 
Note: G = Games played; AB = At bats; H = Hits; Avg. = Batting average; HR = Home runs; RBI = Runs batted in

Pitching

Starting pitchers 
Note: G = Games pitched; IP = Innings pitched; W = Wins; L = Losses; ERA = Earned run average; SO = Strikeouts

Other pitchers 
Note: G = Games pitched; IP = Innings pitched; W = Wins; L = Losses; ERA = Earned run average; SO = Strikeouts

Relief pitchers 
Note: G = Games pitched; W = Wins; L = Losses; SV = Saves; ERA = Earned run average; SO = Strikeouts

Farm system 

LEAGUE CHAMPIONS: Winnipeg, Billings

References

External links
1959 St. Louis Cardinals at Baseball Reference
1959 St. Louis Cardinals team page at www.baseball-almanac.com

St. Louis Cardinals seasons
Saint Louis Cardinals season
1959 in sports in Missouri